Negotiated order is an approach in sociology that is interested in how meaning is created and maintained in organizations. It has a particular focus on human interactions.

See also 
Anselm Strauss
George Herbert Mead
Erving Goffman

Sources 
Maines, David R., & Joy Charlton. (1985). Negotiated Order Approach to the Analysis of Social Organization. Studies in Symbolic Interaction, Supplement 1, 271–308. 
Reed, Michael. (1991). The Sociology of Organizations: Themes, Perspectives, Prospects. Hempel Hempstead, 83–92. 
Regan, Thomas G. (1984). Some Limits to the Hospital as Negotiated Order. Social Science and Medicine 18, 243–249. 
Strauss, Anselm. (1978). Negotiations: Varieties, Processes, Contexts, and Social Order. San Francisco, 105–141. 
Strauss, Anselm, et al. (1994). The Hospital and Its Negotiated Order. In Eliot Freidson (Ed.), The Hospital in Modern Society. New York, 147–169.

Dispute resolution